HubSpot is an American developer and marketer of software products for inbound marketing, sales, and customer service. HubSpot was founded by Brian Halligan and Dharmesh Shah in 2006.

Its products and services aim to provide tools for customer relationship management, social media marketing, content management, lead generation, web analytics, search engine optimization, live chat, and customer support.

History
HubSpot was founded by Brian Halligan and Dharmesh Shah at the Massachusetts Institute of Technology (MIT) in 2006.

The company grew from $255,000 in revenues in 2007, to $15.6 million in 2010.  Later that year, HubSpot acquired Oneforty, the Twitter app store founded by Laura Fitton. The company also introduced new software for personalizing websites for each visitor. According to Forbes, HubSpot started out targeting small companies but "moved steadily upmarket to serve larger businesses of up to 1000 employees." HubSpot filed for an initial public offering with the Securities and Exchange Commission on August 25, 2014, requesting they be listed on the New York Stock Exchange under the ticker symbol HUBS. They raised more than $140 million by selling shares for $25 apiece. The stock has exploded since, hitting an all-time high of $841.26 on November 12th, 2021. In July 2017, HubSpot acquired Kemvi, which applies artificial intelligence and machine learning to help sales teams. The company reported revenues of $1 Billion in 2021.

In February 2021, Axios reported that HubSpot would be acquiring The Hustle, a content and email newsletter company focused on small business owners and entrepreneurs.

In September 2021, HubSpot announced Yamini Rangan as their new CEO, while Brian Halligan stepped out from the role and became an Executive Chairman at the company.

Software and services
HubSpot Marketing Software provides tools for social media marketing, content management, web analytics, landing pages, customer support, and search engine optimization.

HubSpot has integration features for salesforce.com, SugarCRM, NetSuite, Microsoft Dynamics CRM, and others.  There are also third-party services such as templates, and extensions. Additionally, HubSpot offers consulting services and an online resource academy for learning inbound marketing tactics. It also hosts user group conferences and inbound marketing and certification programs.  HubSpot promotes their inbound marketing concepts through their own marketing, and has been called "a prolific creator of content" such as blogs, social media, webinars and white papers.

In 2010, an article in the Harvard Business Review said that HubSpot's most effective inbound marketing feature was its free online tools. One such tool, the Marketing Grader, assessed and scored website performance. The company introduced a Twitter tracking feature in 2011.

In November 2016, HubSpot launched HubSpot Academy, an online training platform that provides various digital marketing training programs.

In 2018, HubSpot integrated Taboola on the dashboard, a global pay-per-click native ad network.

In November 2019, HubSpot acquired PieSync, a customer data synchronization platform.

In August 2021, HubSpot partnered with Envato to launch hundreds of high-quality CMS Hub templates.

HubSpot CRM Free
The company launched HubSpot CRM Free in 2014. The CRM product tracks and manages interactions between a company and its customers and prospects. It enables companies to forecast revenue, measure sales team productivity, and report on revenue sources. The software as a service product is free and integrates with Gmail, G Suite, Microsoft Office for Windows, and other software.

Marketing Hub
HubSpot Marketing Hub integrates customer relationship and social media management, campaign automation, and email marketing. Usability features were added to the marketing tool in 2020. As of 2021, there are four service tiers (Free, Starter, Professional, and Enterprise). Starter offers basic analytics, and Professional enables additional marketing automation options, custom workflows, A/B testing, more inboxes, and support for more currencies. The Enterprise version allows access to more contacts, revenue reporting, custom event automation, and campaign reporting.

Operations Hub
HubSpot launched Operations Hub in 2021 as an extension of the customer relationship management tool. Available in multiple service tiers, Operations Hub helps customers use data in the CRM.

Service Hub
HubSpot's customer service tool, Service Hub (previously known as Customer Hub) was announced in 2017, moved out of beta testing in 2018, and received a "refresh" in 2022. The contact center platform provides self-service automation, Twilio telephony, as well as "sentiment analysis and churn forecasting" and testimonial capturing, according to The Irish Times. TechCrunch says Service Hub also includes a "universal inbox" for all customer communications, tools for developing a "company knowledge base" and surveys, and a dashboard for team tracking.

HubSpot Academy
HubSpot Academy is an online training program with free courses for content, email, inbound and social media marketing, as well as graphic design and search engine optimization. Some of the courses offer certifications. In 2022, Avi Stern of The Jerusalem Post and Christian Rigg of TechRadar described the Academy as "one of the nation's leading digital marketing sources for businesses" and "an industry-leading learning center for all things CRM", respectively.

Tech industry reviews
HubSpot has been described as unique because it strives to provide its customers with an all-in-one approach. A 2012 review in CRM Search said HubSpot was not the best business solution in each category but that taken as a whole, it was the best "marketing solution" that combined many tools into one package. It identified HubSpot's "strengths" as the sophistication of its call to action (marketing) tool, its online ecosystem, and its "ease of use".  Its weakness was described as having "more breadth than depth." The review said the lack of customization and design tools could be limiting and that it was missing advanced features such as business process management (BPM) tools to manage workflow.

Conferences

HubSpot hosts an annual marketing conference for HubSpot users and partners called "INBOUND". The event is typically located in Boston. In 2019, HubSpot hosted its largest conference in the event's history, with a record of over 26,000 attendees from 110 countries. The first INBOUND conference took place in 2012. Since then, speakers such as Oprah Winfrey, Michelle Obama, Barack Obama, Tig Notaro, and Issa Rae have spoken at their events.

Controversy
In July 2015, HubSpot's CMO, Mike Volpe, was dismissed for violating HubSpot's code of business conduct. It was found that he tried to obtain a draft copy of the book Disrupted: My Misadventure in the Start Up Bubble, written by his former employee Daniel Lyons. According to an article in The Boston Globe, records obtained under the Freedom of Information Act indicated that HubSpot executives considered the book "a financial threat to HubSpot" and Volpe used "tactics such as email hacking and extortion" in the attempt to prevent the book from being published.

In April 2016, after his book was published, Lyons wrote in The New York Times that HubSpot had a "frat house" atmosphere. He also called the company a "digital sweatshop" in which workers had little job security. Later that month, HubSpot's founders gave an official response to the book, in which they addressed several, but not all, of Lyons' claims.

Reception
The Boston Business Journal named HubSpot a "Best Place to Work in 2012". In 2015, the company was named the best large company to work for in Massachusetts by The Boston Globe. In 2017, HubSpot was named seventh by CNBC as one of the best places to work. Glassdoor named HubSpot the best place to work in 2020 and the #2 best place to work in 2022.

References

Further reading

External links

 
 

 

Technology companies based in the Boston area
Companies based in Cambridge, Massachusetts
Marketing companies established in 2006
Digital marketing companies of the United States
Search engine optimization
Software companies based in Massachusetts
Web analytics
Marketing software
Companies listed on the New York Stock Exchange
2006 establishments in Massachusetts
Customer relationship management software companies
Software companies of the United States
2014 initial public offerings